Reiko Kudo (工藤礼子) is the partner of Tori Kudo of the Japanese underground music group Maher Shalal Hash Baz. In the late seventies and early eighties, while still known under her maiden name of Reiko Omura, she led a unit called Noise. Noise played in Tokyo underground venues like Minor (alongside groups like Fushitsusha and Kousokuya), and released one album, Tenno. As well as often singing with and writing songs for Maher Shalal Hash Baz, Reiko has released several albums of her own.

Discography
Noise
 V.A., Heaven Tapes (Heaven, 1979)
 Noise, Tenno (Engel, 1980; reissued on LP, Org, 1997; on CD, Pataphysique 1997; Alchemy, 2005)
 Inryofuen / Gyoshinkyoku + noise live '82.7.11 (Cragale, 1999, cdr)

Solo
 Fire Inside My Hat (Org, 1997)
 夜の稲　(Yoru no ina)/rice field silently riping in the night (Majikick/Periodic Document, 2001)
 人 (Hito)/person (Hyotan, 2006)
 草 (Kusa)/grass (Hyotan, 2006)
 ちりをなめる (Chiri wo nameru)/licking up dust (Hyotan, 2007)

References
Interview. Heaven Express, volume 9, 1981 (Japanese)
Interview. Taajii, volume 4, 1997. pp. 56–57 (Japanese)
Interview. Le Grande Illusion, issue 4, 2006 (Japanese)

External links
Reiko Kudo blog (Japanese)
Songs written by Reiko for Maher Shalal Hash Baz (Japanese)

Living people
Musicians from Tokyo
Year of birth missing (living people)
Place of birth missing (living people)